Norwood is an area and Metropolitan Borough of Sefton ward in the Southport Parliamentary constituency that covers the localities of Blowick and Highpark in the town of Southport.

Councillors

Councillors Bill Welsh and Marianne Welsh both left the Liberal Democrats in July 2017. Later that year in September, they both rejoined Sefton Council representing Labour for Norwood ward. In 2019, neither Bill Welsh or Marianne Welsh contested that year's local election. Steven Myers and Carran Janet Waterfield, both Labour candidates, were elected, albeit with a much-reduced majority. A previous councillor for the ward is Ronnie Fearn, the former Liberal Democrat MP for Southport.

Election results
Councillors are elected every four years. The Metropolitan Borough of Sefton elects a third of there councillors each election therefore there is an election every year apart from the fourth year.

Elections of the 2020s

Note: The May 2020 election was postponed due to the COVID-19 pandemic, and was rescheduled in May 2021

Elections of the 2010s

}}

References

Wards of the Metropolitan Borough of Sefton